Jo O-ryeon (조오련, 5 October 1952 – 4 August 2009) was a South Korean freestyle swimmer. He competed in two events at the 1972 Summer Olympics. He later practiced long-distance open-water swimming, swimming the Korea Strait in 1980, and at the end of that year was awarded the Chreongryong Medal for his athletic feats. In 1982, he swam the English Channel, crossing from England-to-France in 9:35. In 2003 Jo served on the Korean Olympic Committee.

References

External links
 

1952 births
2009 deaths
South Korean male freestyle swimmers
Olympic swimmers of South Korea
Swimmers at the 1972 Summer Olympics
Asian Games gold medalists for South Korea
Asian Games silver medalists for South Korea
Asian Games bronze medalists for South Korea
Asian Games medalists in swimming
Swimmers at the 1970 Asian Games
Swimmers at the 1974 Asian Games
Swimmers at the 1978 Asian Games
Medalists at the 1970 Asian Games
Medalists at the 1974 Asian Games
Medalists at the 1978 Asian Games
English Channel swimmers
Place of birth missing
20th-century South Korean people